Sundarpur-Durgapur Union is a union parishad of Kaliganj Upazila, in Jhenaidah District, Khulna Division of Bangladesh. There are 16 villages and 13 mouzas in the union.

References

External links
 

Unions of Khulna Division
Unions of Kaliganj Upazila, Jhenaidah
Unions of Jhenaidah District